Tyler Nicklaus Hague (born on September 24, 1975) is a United States Space Force colonel and a NASA astronaut of the class of 2013. Selected to be a flight engineer on the International Space Station, his first launch was on Soyuz MS-10, which aborted shortly after take-off on October 11, 2018. His second launch, on March 14, 2019, was successful, taking him and his fellow Soyuz MS-12 crew members to join ISS Expedition 59/60.

Education
Hague was born in Belleville, Kansas in 1975.  He attended Peabody-Burns Elementary School, in Peabody, Kansas, while his father was the principal of Peabody-Burns High School from 1982 to 1989.  In 1994, Nick graduated from Hoxie High School in Hoxie, Kansas, while his father was superintendent of the school district.  Nick considers Hoxie his hometown.

In 1998, he completed a B.Sc. in Aerospace Engineering from the United States Air Force Academy and continued to study and graduate with a M.Sc. in Aerospace Engineering from Massachusetts Institute of Technology in 2000.

In the U.S. Air Force
Hague joined the U.S. Air Force and was commissioned as second lieutenant in May 1998. He was assigned to the Kirtland Air Force Base, Albuquerque, New Mexico in August 2000, working on advanced spacecraft technologies.

In 2003, Hague attended the United States Air Force Test Pilot School, in Edwards Air Force Base, California. Following graduation in 2004, he was assigned to the 416th Flight Test Squadron and tested the F-16, F-15 and T-38 aircraft.

Hague was deployed in Iraq for five months in 2004, supporting Operation Iraqi Freedom, and conducting experimental airborne reconnaissance.

In 2006, Hague started teaching courses in the Department of Astronautics faculty at the United States Air Force Academy, Colorado. He has taught courses in introductory astronautics, linear control system analysis and design. 

In 2009, Hague received a fellowship for the Air Force Fellows program in Washington, D.C.

From 2012 until 2013 Hague worked in the Department of Defense as Deputy Chief of the Joint Improvised Explosive Device Defeat Organization.

Hague was promoted to colonel in 2016. His transfer to the U.S. Space Force was approved in December 2020.

NASA

Hague was selected by NASA as part of Astronaut Group 21 and completed training in July 2015, making him available for future missions.

Expedition 57/58 (aborted)
Hague was the first astronaut of the 2013 NASA astronaut class to be selected for a mission; he was slated to be a flight engineer for Expedition 57/58. 

On October 11, 2018, Hague and Aleksey Ovchinin boarded Soyuz MS-10 on the way to the International Space Station, but the launch was aborted mid-flight due to a booster failure; the crew landed safely after a ballistic descent, minutes from launch. As a result, NASA considered this to be Hague's first spaceflight, unlike RSA, and the two agencies therefore count subsequent flights differently.

Expedition 59/60
Hague launched to the ISS again on March 14, 2019, travelling on Soyuz MS-12 with Russian Commander Aleksey Ovchinin and fellow American astronaut Christina Koch. The trio joined Commander Oleg Kononenko and Flight Engineers David Saint-Jacques and Anne McClain on Expedition 59. After the departure of Kononenko, Saint-Jacques and McClain in July 2019, Ovchinin, Hague and Koch will transfer over to Expedition 60, with Ovchinin taking command of the station, and would subsequently return to Earth in early October 2019. According to a Russian news site, it was under consideration that Hague would stay on the ISS after the landing of Soyuz MS-12 and instead land with Soyuz MS-15, this mission would happen in order to fly a cosmonaut from the United Arab Emirates Mohammed bin Rashid Space Centre, who would launch on Soyuz MS-15 and land on Soyuz MS-12 10 or so days later. If Hague had undertaken the mission then he would have spent over 14 months on the ISS, the only other space mission to last around that long was Valeri Polyakov's Soyuz TM-18/Soyuz TM-20 mission to the Mir space station, which lasted 437d 17h 58m, the longest single stay in space in history. In an interview with Space.com in February 2019, Hague stated that his mission would be lasting 204 days, meaning the prospect of him staying 14 months on the station was off the table.

On March 22, 2019, Hague and Anne McClain performed their first spacewalk to install the adapter plates while Dextre swaps the batteries between spacewalks. The EVA lasted 6 hours and 39 minutes. They also removed debris from the Unity Module in preparation for the arrival of Cygnus NG-11 in April, stowing tools for the repair of the flex hose rotary coupler, and securing tiebacks on the solar array blanket boxes.

Hague performed his second EVA together with Christina Koch. Originally designated to be the first "all-female" EVA, Hague was reassigned to it after space suit issues prevented both women from going on the EVA. EVA lasted 6 hours and 45 minutes.

On August 21, Hague performed his third EVA, together with Andrew Morgan. EVA lasted 6 hours and 32 minutes, while the astronauts installed a new International Docking Adapter (IDA). During the EVA, Hague wore the Artemis program logo on his suit.

Honors and awards
During his service in the Air Force, Hague has received the following awards: 
 Distinguished Graduate, United States Air Force Academy;
 Distinguished Graduate and top flight test engineer in the United States Air Force Test Pilot School Class 03A; 
 Defense Meritorious Service Medal (twice)
 Air Medal (six times),
 Aerial Achievement Medal (twice)
 Air Force Commendation Medal (twice)
 Air Force Combat Action Medal, as well as various other campaign and service awards.

Additionally, he was awarded the Order of Courage of the Russian Federation for his actions during Expedition 57/58.

Personal life
Hague met his wife, Col. Catie Hague in 1996 at the Air Force Academy. They have two sons. Hague is a Doctor Who fan.

References

External links

 NASA Astronaut Bio
 Astronaut moments: Nick Hague, NASA Johnson Space center
 

1975 births
Living people
United States Air Force officers
MIT School of Engineering alumni
People from Belleville, Kansas
People from Hoxie, Kansas
People from Peabody, Kansas
Military personnel from Kansas
Recipients of the Air Medal
Recipients of the Order of Courage
United States Air Force personnel of the Iraq War
United States Air Force astronauts
United States Space Force astronauts
United States Space Force officers
United States Air Force Academy alumni 
U.S. Air Force Test Pilot School alumni
People who have flown in suborbital spaceflight
Spacewalkers